The 1977 Individual Speedway World Championship was the 32nd edition of the official World Championship to determine the world champion rider.

History was made in the 1977 final when Ivan Mauger of New Zealand equalled Ove Fundin's title record of five World Championship wins. Mauger had gone close to equalling the record before and finally achieved it in Sweden, the home of Fundin. In a decisive 18th heat Mauger won from his nearest challenger Ole Olsen, when Olsen was forced to lay his bike down to avoid hitting John Boulger. The result was just one point for Olsen, a badly damaged Jawa bike and the end of his title hopes. Defending champion Peter Collins won his last ride to claim the silver medal despite riding with a broken left leg, but Olsen won the bronze medal run-off against young English rider Michael Lee.

Australian Qualification

Australian Final
February 25, 1977
 Newcastle
First 8 to Australasian final

New Zealand Qualification

New Zealand Final
February 12, 1977
 Auckland
First 8 to Australasian final

Swedish Qualification

Swedish Final
June 24–26, 1977
 - 3 Rounds (Vetlanda, Norrköping & Eskilstuna)
First 4 to World final plus 1 reserve

British Qualification

British Final
July 13, 1977
 Coventry, Brandon Stadium
First 5 to Intercontinental final plus Peter Collins seeded to Intercontinental final.

Intercontinental Round

Australasian Final
 February 19, 1977
  Sydney
 First 4 to Intercontinental final

Norwegian Final
 April 17, 1977
  Sandnes
 First 5 to Nordic Final

Danish Final
 May 19, 1977
 Fredericia
 First 6 to Nordic Final

Nordic Final
May 29, 1977
 Tampere
First 4 to Intercontinental final

American Final
July 29, 1977
 Los Angeles, Costa Mesa Speedway
First 2 to Intercontinental final

Intercontinental Final
August 21, 1977
 London, White City Stadium
First 7 to World Final

Continental Round

Continental Final
July 25, 1977
 Togliatti
First 5 to World Final plus 1 reserve

World Final
September 2, 1977
 Göteborg, Ullevi
Referee: Torrie Kittelsen

References

1977
World Individual
1977 in Swedish motorsport
Speedway competitions in Sweden